Amfreville-sous-les-Monts is a commune in the Eure department in Normandy in north-western France. It is around 20 km southeast of Rouen.

Population

See also
Communes of the Eure department

References

Communes of Eure